Argyria heringi is a moth in the family Crambidae. It was described by Stanisław Błeszyński in 1960. It is found in Guyana.

References

Argyriini
Moths described in 1960
Moths of South America